Brushy Lake Park is a  former Oklahoma state park located in Sequoyah County, Oklahoma,  north of the city of Sallisaw, Oklahoma.  Located in the scenic wooded Cookson Hills of eastern Oklahoma beside the  Brushy Lake, this park offers visitors a quiet, secluded recreation destination with camping, picnic areas, fishing and boating. Facilities include eight day-use picnic areas with tables and grills, group shelters with electricity, 23 concrete camping sites including RV sites, playgrounds and a lighted boat ramp, as well as boat and fishing docks.  Electric service, water service and comfort stations with showers are all available.

After being proposed for closure in 2011, management and ownership of the park were transferred to the city of Sallisaw.

An interview with park manager Mike Hancock in 2014 indicates that the park's situation has improved since the responsibility was handed to the city. He noted that the RV and camping spaces were staying full because the city was better able to fund maintenance that had previously been deferred by the state.

References

Protected areas of Sequoyah County, Oklahoma